Găureni may refer to several places:

 Găureni, a village in Miroslava Commune, Iași County, Romania
 Găureni, a village in Zîmbreni Commune, Ialoveni district, Moldova
 Găureni, a village in Bălănești Commune, Nisporeni district, Moldova
 Găureni, a river in Iași County and Vaslui County, Romania, tributary of the Bârlad
 Găureni (Țibleș), a river in Bistrița-Năsăud County, Romania, tributary of the Țibleș
Găureni, the former name of Alunișul village, Zagra Commune, Bistrița-Năsăud County, Romania 
Găureni, the former name of Dumbrava village, Grănicești Commune, Suceava County, Romania